A main street manager is a United States professional who helps small cities and towns maintain and improve their main street typically through a government program or public–private partnership.  Objectives may include economic, preservation, restoration, marketing, and relations between business, consumers and the government.

Objective
The primary objective is to develop and administer the main street program.  The National Trust for Historic Preservation describes ten standards of performance for administering a main street program.

Role
 Develops and administers a city's main street program
 Assists and approves applications for grants, tax credits
 Design plans for preservation and/or restoration
 Develops marketing collateral and campaigns
 Advises city planners on parking
 Determines resources needed to maintain cleanliness, appearance, 
 Schedules events and festivals.  Advises planners.

References

External links
 Kentucky Heritage Council – Main Street Program
 Preservation Nation – Career Center – Professions

Historic preservation
Urban planning in the United States